Mandala Krida Stadium (Stadion Mandala Krida) is a football stadium located in Yogyakarta, Yogyakarta Special Region, Indonesia. The stadium is surrounded by three roads, namely east is the Gondosuli Road, south is Kenari Road, and west is the Andung Road. The stadium is used mostly for football matches in general and also held several large events in the city, such as concerts, the presidential campaign, and Eid prayers. The stadium is home of PSIM Yogyakarta and was venues of major league games Medco 4 in 2008. The new stadium can accommodate 35,000 people.

References

Sports venues in Indonesia
Football venues in Indonesia
Athletics (track and field) venues in Indonesia
Buildings and structures in Yogyakarta